John Klenke (born April 25, 1958) is a Wisconsin politician who served as a Republican member of the Wisconsin State Assembly, representing the 88th district.  In January 2014, he announced he would not seek re-election.

Klenke graduated from University of Wisconsin–Madison in 1980 with a Bachelor of Business Administration degree (Finance) and from University of Wisconsin–Milwaukee in 1982 with a Master of Business Administration degree (Taxation). He worked for Schneider National as a treasurer, vice president of corporate strategy, division president, and director of corporate tax. Klenke retired from his business executive position at Schneider National after being elected to the Wisconsin State Assembly in 2010.

Klenke defeated two-term Democratic incumbent James Soletski in the November 2010 general election. Klenke was unopposed in the primary election.

Notes

Wisconsin School of Business alumni
University of Wisconsin–Milwaukee alumni
1958 births
Living people
21st-century American politicians
Republican Party members of the Wisconsin State Assembly